Songs from St. Somewhere is the twenty-eighth studio album by American singer-songwriter Jimmy Buffett. The album was released on August 20, 2013, by Mailboat Records.

Critical reception

Songs from St. Somewhere garnered generally mixed reception by music critics. At The Oakland Press, Gary Graff said that the album is not up to the same caliber of his previous album, nonetheless this is "a perfectly fine fix between boat drinks for any Parrothead worth his or her feathers." Stephen Thomas Erlewine of AllMusic evoked that this is the perfect album for a listener who's drunk, which he said was "perfectly fine" for that occasion, but for those "listening to this sober, it's quite likely you'll be more inclined to cringe than to smile." At Rolling Stone, Jon Dolan alluded to how this release "is full of chill evocations of island life."

Commercial performance
The album debuted at number 4 on the Billboard 200 chart, with first-week sales of 60,388 copies in the United States.

Tour
 

Miscellaneous performances
 This show was a part of the Boston Strong Benefit show.
 This show was a benefit show.

Track listing

Personnel
 Mark Knopfler - guitar on 'Oldest Surfer on the Beach'
The Coral Reefers
 Eric Darken - percussion
 Robert Greenidge - steel drums
 Doyle Grisham - pedal steel guitar
 Tina Gullickson - vocals
 Roger Guth - drums
 Will Kimbrough - vocals
 John Lovell - trumpet
 Jim Mayer - vocals, bass guitar
 Peter Mayer - guitar
 Mac McAnally - vocals, guitar 
 Nadirah Shakoor - vocals
 Michael Utley - keyboards
 Jimmy Buffett - vocals, guitar

Chart positions

References

2013 albums
Jimmy Buffett albums
Mailboat Records albums
Albums produced by Mac McAnally
Albums produced by Michael Utley